Naved Sarwar (born 17 November 1989) is a Pakistani first-class cricketer who plays for National Bank of Pakistan.

References

External links
 

1989 births
Living people
Pakistani cricketers
Kalutara Town Club cricketers
National Bank of Pakistan cricketers
Sialkot cricketers
Cricketers from Sialkot